The strip packing problem is a 2-dimensional geometric minimization problem. 
Given a set of axis-aligned rectangles and a strip of bounded width and infinite height, determine an overlapping-free packing of the rectangles into the strip minimizing its height. 
This problem is a cutting and packing problem and is classified as an Open Dimension Problem according to Wäscher et al.

This problem arises in the area of scheduling, where it models jobs, that require a contiguous portion of the memory over a given time period. Another example is the area of industrial manufacturing, where rectangular pieces need to be cut out of a sheet of material (e.g., cloth or paper) that has a fixed width but infinite length, and one wants to minimize the wasted material.

This problem was first studied in 1980. It is strongly-NP hard and there exists no polynomial time approximation algorithm with a ratio smaller than   unless .

Definition 
An instance  of the strip packing problem consists of a strip with width  and infinite height, as well as a set  of rectangular items. 
Each item  has a width  and a height  .
A packing of the items is a mapping that maps each lower-left corner of an item  to a position   inside the strip. 
An inner point of a placed item  is a point from the set .
Two (placed) items overlap if they share an inner point.
The objective is to find an overlapping-free packing of the items inside the strip while minimizing the height of the packing.

This definition is used for all polynomial time algorithms. For pseudo-polynomial time and FPT-algorithms, the definition is slightly changed for the simplification of notation. In this case, all appearing sizes are integral. Especially the width of the strip is given by an arbitrary integer number larger than 1. Note that these two definitions are equivalent.

Variants 
There are several variants of the strip packing problem that have been studied. These variants concern the geometry of the objects, dimension of the problem, if it is allowed to rotate the items, and the structure of the packing.

Geometry of the items: In the standard variant of this problem, the set of given items consists of rectangles.
In an often considered subcase, all the items have to be squares. This variant was already considered in the first paper about strip packing.
Additionally, variants have been studied where the shapes are circular or even irregular. In the latter case, we speak of irregular strip packing.

Dimension:
When not mentioned differently the strip packing problem is a 2-dimensional problem. However, it also has been studied in three or even more dimensions. In this case, the objects are hyperrectangles, and the strip is open-ended in one dimension and bounded in the residual ones.

Rotation: In the classical strip packing problem, it is not allowed to rotate the items. However, variants have been studied where rotating by 90 degrees or even an arbitrary angle is allowed.

Structure of the packing:
In the general strip packing problem, the structure of the packing is irrelevant. 
However, there are applications that have explicit requirements on the structure of the packing. One of these requirements is to be able to cut the items from the strip by horizontal or vertical edge to edge cuts. 
Packings that allow this kind of cutting are called guillotine packing.

Hardness 
The strip packing problem contains the bin packing problem as a special case when all the items have the same height 1. 
For this reason, it is strongly NP-hard and there can be no polynomial time approximation algorithm, which has an approximation ratio smaller than  unless . 
Note that both lower bounds  and  also hold for the case that a rotation of the items by 90 degrees is allowed.
Additionally, it was proven by Ashok et al. that strip packing is  W[1]-hard when parameterized by the height of the optimal packing.

Properties of optimal solutions 

There are two trivial lower bounds on optimal solutions. 
The first is the height of the largest item. 
Define . 
Then it holds that

.

Another lower bound is given by the total area of the items. 
Define  then it holds that

.

For the first lower bound assume that the items are sorted by non-increasing height. Define . For each  define  the first index such that . Then it holds that

.

For the second lower bound, partition the set of items into three sets. Then it holds that

, where   for each .

On the other hand, Steinberg has shown that the height of an optimal solution can be upper bounded by

, where  .

Polynomial time approximation algorithms 
Since this problem is NP-hard, approximation algorithms have been studied for this problem. 
Finding an algorithm with a ratio below  seems hard, and
the complexity of the corresponding algorithms increases regarding their running time and their descriptions.

Bottom-up left-justified (BL)

This algorithm was first described by Baker et al. It works as follows:

Let  be a sequence of rectangular items. 
The algorithm iterates the sequence in the given order. 
For each considered item , it searches for the bottom-most position to place it and then shifts it as far to the left as possible. 
Hence, it places  at the bottom-most left-most possible coordinate  in the strip.

This algorithm has the following properties:
 The approximation ratio of this algorithm cannot be bounded by a constant.
 If the items are ordered by decreasing widths, then .
 If the item are all squares and are ordered by decreasing widths, then .
 For any , there exists a list  of rectangles ordered by decreasing widths such that .
 For any , there exists a list  of squares ordered by decreasing widths such that .

Next-fit decreasing-height (NFDH) 

This algorithm was first described by Coffman et al. in 1980 and works as follows:

Let  be the given set of rectangular items. 
First, the algorithm sorts the items by order of nonincreasing height.
Then, starting at position , the algorithm places the items next to each other in the strip until the next item will overlap the right border of the strip.
At this point, the algorithm defines a new level at the top of the tallest item in the current level and places the items next to each other in this new level.

This algorithm has the following properties:
 For every  there exists a set of rectangles  such that 
 The packing generated is a guillotine packing. This means the items can be obtained through a sequence of horizontal or vertical edge-to-edge cuts.

First-fit decreasing-height (FFDH) 
This algorithm, first described by Coffman et al. in 1980, works similar to the NFDH algorithm.
However, when placing the next item, the algorithm scans the levels from bottom to top and places the item in the first level on which it will fit. 
A new level is only opened if the item does not fit in any previous ones.

This algorithm has the following properties:
 Let . For any set of items  and strip with width  such that  for each , it holds that .
Furthermore, for each , there exists a set of squares   such that  .
 The packing generated is a guillotine packing. This means the items can be obtained through a sequence of horizontal or vertical edge-to-edge cuts.

The split-fit algorithm (SF) 
This algorithm was first described by Coffman et al. 
For a given set of items  and strip with width , it works as follows:

 Determinate , the largest integer such that the given rectangles have width  or less.
 Use the FFDH algorithm to pack the items in  using the area  as well.

This algorithm has the following properties:
 For every set of items  and the corresponding , it holds that .
 For each , there is a set of items   such that  .

Sleator's algorithm 
For a given set of items  and strip with width , it works as follows:

Call the total height of these items . All the other items will be placed above .
 Sort all the remaining items in nonincreasing order of height. The items will be placed in this order. 
The algorithm places the items on this shelf in nonincreasing order of height until no item is left or the next one does not fit.
 Let  be the highest point covered by any item in the left half and  the corresponding point on the right half. These two lines build new shelves on which the algorithm will place the items, as in step 3. Choose the half which has the lower shelf and place the items on this shelf until no other item fits. Repeat this step until no item is left.

This algorithm has the following properties:

The split algorithm (SP) 
This algorithm is an extension of Sleator's approach and was first described by Golan. 
It places the items in nonincreasing order of width. 
The intuitive idea is to split the strip into sub-strips while placing some items. 
Whenever possible, the algorithm places the current item  side-by-side of an already placed item . 
In this case, it splits the corresponding sub-strip into two pieces: one containing the first item  and the other containing the current item .
If this is not possible, it places  on top of an already placed item and does not split the sub-strip.

This algorithm creates a set  S  of sub-strips. For each sub-strip  s ∈ S we know its lower left corner  s.xposition and  s.yposition, its width  s.width, the horizontal lines parallel to the upper and lower border of the item placed last inside this sub-strip  s.upper and  s.lower, as well as the width of it  s.itemWidth.

 function Split Algorithm (SP) is
     input: items  I, width of the strip W
     output: A packing of the items
     Sort I in nonincreasing order of widths;
     Define empty list S of sub-strips;
     Define a new sub-strip s with s.xposition = 0, s.yposition = 0, s.width = W, s.lower = 0, s.upper = 0, s.itemWidth = W;
     Add s to S;
     while I not empty do
         i := I.pop(); Removes widest item from I
         Define new list S_2 containing all the substrips with s.width - s.itemWidth ≥ i.width; 
         S_2 contains all sub-strips where i fits next to the already placed item
         if S_2 is empty then
             In this case, place the item on top of another one.
             Find the sub-strip s in S with smallest s.upper; i.e. the least filled sub-strip
             Place i at position (s.xposition, s.upper);
             Update s: s.lower := s.upper; s.upper := s.upper+i.height; s.itemWidth := i.width;
         else 
             In this case, place the item next to another one at the same level and split the corresponding sub-strip at this position.
             Find s ∈ S_2 with the smallest s.lower;
             Place i at position (s.xposition + s.itemWidth, s.lower);
             Remove s from S;
             Define two new sub-strips s1 and s2 with 
             s1.xposition = s.xposition, s1.yposition = s.upper, s1.width = s.itemWidth, s1.lower = s.upper, s1.upper = s.upper, s1.itemWidth = s.itemWidth;
             s2.xposition = s.xposition+s.itemWidth, s2.yposition = s.lower, s2.width = s.width - s.itemWidth, s2.lower = s.lower, s2.upper = s.lower + i.height, s2.itemWidth = i.width;
             S.add(s1,s2);
     return 
 end function

This algorithm has the following properties:
 For any set of items  it holds that .
 For any , there exists a set of items  such that .

Reverse-fit (RF)
This algorithm was first described by Schiermeyer. 
The description of this algorithm needs some additional notation. 

Given a set of items  and a strip of width , it works as follows:
Denote by  the height of this stack. All other items will be packed above .
 Sort the remaining items in order of nonincreasing height and consider the items in this order in the following steps. Let  be the height of the tallest of these remaining items.
 Place the items one by one left aligned on a shelf defined by  until no other item fit on this shelf or there is  no item left. Call this shelf the first level. 
 Let  be the height of the tallest unpacked item. The algorithm will fill this shelf from right to left, aligning  the items to the right, such that the items touch this shelf with their top. Call this shelf the second reverse-level. 
 Place the items into the two shelves due to First-Fit, i.e., placing the items in the first level where they fit and in the second one otherwise. Proceed until there are no items left, or the total width of the items in the second shelf is at least . 
 Shift the second reverse-level down until an item from it touches an item from the first level. Define  as the new vertical position of the shifted shelf. Define .
 If  then  is the last rectangle placed in the second reverse-level. Shift all the other items from this level further down (all the same amount) until the first one touches an item from the first level. Define  as the amount by which the shelf was shifted down. 
 If  then shift  to the left until it touches another item or the border of the strip.
Place  left-aligned in this third level, such that it touches an item from the first level on its left.
 Continue packing the items using the First-Fit heuristic. Each following level (starting at level three) is defined by a horizontal line through the top of the largest item on the previous level. Note that the first item placed in the next level might not touch the border of the strip with their left side, but an item from the first level or the item .

This algorithm has the following properties:
 For every set of items  it produces a packing of height .

Steinberg's algorithm (ST)

Steinbergs algorithm is a recursive one. Given a set of rectangular items  and a rectangular target region with width  and height , it proposes four reduction rules, that place some of the items and leaves a smaller rectangular region with the same properties as before regarding of the residual items. 
Steinbergs shows that if

then all the items can be placed inside the target region of size .
Each reduction rule will produce a smaller target area and a subset of items that have to be placed. When the condition from above holds before the procedure started, then the created subproblem will have this property as well.

Procedure 1: It can be applied if .

 Sort them by nonincreasing width and place them left-aligned at the bottom of the target region. Let  be their total height.
 Find all the items  with width .
 If  is empty, define the new target region as the area above , i.e. it has height  and width . Solve the problem consisting of this new target region and the reduced set of items with one of the procedures.
 If  is not empty, sort it by nonincreasing height and place the items right allinged one by one in the upper right corner of the target area. Let  be the total width of these items. Define a new target area with width  and height  in the upper left corner. Solve the problem consisting of this new target region and the reduced set of items with one of the procedures.

 Place the wider one in the lower-left corner of the target area and the more narrow one left-aligned on the top of the first.
 Define a new target area on the right of these both items, such that it has the width  and height .
 Place the residual items in  into the new target area using one of the procedures.

 as well as 

 Set .
 Define two new rectangular target areas one at the lower-left corner of the original one with height  and width  and the other left of it with height  and width .
 Use one of the procedures to place the items in  into the first new target area and the items in  into the second one.

Note that procedures 1 to 3 have a symmetric version when swapping the height and the width of the items and the target region.

 Define a new target area right of this item such that it has the width  and height  and place the residual items inside this area using one of the procedures.

This algorithm has the following properties:
 For every set of items  it produces a packing of height .

Pseudo-polynomial time approximation algorithms 
When considering this type of algorithms, all the sizes of the items and the strip are given as integrals. Furthermore, the width of the strip  is allowed to appear polynomially in the running time. 

The pseudo-polynomial time algorithms that have been developed mostly use the same approach. It is shown that each optimal solution can be simplified and transformed into one that has one of a constant number of structures. The algorithm then iterates all these structures and places the items inside using linear and dynamic programming.

Online algorithms 
In the online variant of strip packing, the items arrive over time. When an item arrives, it has to be placed immediately before the next item is known. There are two types of online algorithms that have been considered. In the first variant, it is not allowed to alter the packing once an item is placed. In the second, items may be repacked when another item arrives. This variant is called the migration model.

The quality of an online algorithm is measured by the (absolute) competitive ratio

,

where  corresponds to the solution generated by the online algorithm and  corresponds to the size of the optimal solution. 
In addition to the absolute competitive ratio, the asymptotic competitive ratio of online algorithms has been studied. For instances  with  it is defined as

.

Note that all the instances can be scaled such that .

The framework of Han et al. is applicable in the online setting if the online bin packing
algorithm belongs to the class Super Harmonic. Thus, Seiden's online bin packing algorithm
Harmonic++ implies an algorithm for online strip packing with asymptotic ratio 1.58889.

References 

Mathematical analysis
Packing problems
Strongly NP-complete problems